The Aldershot Bullets were an ice hockey franchise based in Aldershot, Hampshire, England. The team were members of the English League Division 3 South Division and played their home games at Aldershot Ice Rink.

History

Single Season of Bullets (1989/1990)
Aldershot entered English League Division 3 South Division as it catered for teams unable to ice sides strong enough to enter import hockey and with an under-sized rink. The Aldershot Ice Rink had a capacity of just 800. The team's colours were Bottle Green, Black & White. The 16 game schedule was not completed in the South with Aldershot playing just 11 matches of which they only won twice and suffered 9 losses.

English League Division 3 South Division Standings

References

Ice hockey teams in England
Sport in Aldershot
Defunct ice hockey teams in the United Kingdom
Ice hockey clubs established in 1989
Sports clubs disestablished in 1991
2001 disestablishments in England